Lymnaeidae, common name the pond snails, is  a taxonomic family of small to large air-breathing freshwater snails, aquatic pulmonate gastropod mollusks, that belong to the clade Hygrophila.

Lymnaeidae is the only family within the superfamily Lymnaeoidea (according to the taxonomy of the Gastropoda by Bouchet & Rocroi, 2005).

Taxonomy

2005 taxonomy 
Bouchet & Rocroi (2005) recognized four subfamilies within Lymnaeidae:
 subfamily Lymnaeinae Rafinesque, 1815 - synonyms: Amphipepleinae Pini, 1877; Limnophysidae W. Dybowski, 1903; Acellinae Hannibal, 1912; Fossariinae B. Dybowski 1913
 subfamily Lancinae Hannibal, 1914
 † subfamily Scalaxinae Zilch, 1959
 † subfamily Valencieniinae Kramberger-Gorjanovic, 1923 - synonym: Clivunellidae Kochansky-Devidé & Sliskovic, 1972

2013 taxonomy
Vinarski (2013) established a new subfamily Radicinae within Lymnaeidae, but be considered position neither of Lancinae nor of extinct genera.
 subfamily Radicinae Vinarski, 2013

Cladogram 
Correa et al. (2010) examined phylogenetic relationships among 50 taxa of this family using a supermatrix approach (concatenation of the 16S, internal transcribed spacers ITS1 and ITS2 genes) involving both maximum likelihood and Bayesian inference. Her phylogenetic analysis demonstrates the existence of three deep clades of Lymnaeidae representing the main geographic origin of species (America, Eurasia and the Indo-Pacific region). It demonstrates that the nomenclature of most genera in the Lymnaeidae does not reflect evolutionary relationships.

A cladogram based on sequences of 16S, internal transcribed spacers ITS1 and ITS2 genes showing phylogenic relations of Lymnaeidae by Correa et al. (2010):

The nomenclature of genera has been one of the most confusing issues in the Lymnaeidae systematics. Most genus names are not fixed and are based more on phenotypic resemblances than on sound evolutionary and phylogenetic considerations. For instance, a single genus in Lymnaeidae was recognized by Walter (1968), two by Hubendick (1951), and up to 34 genera by others. Results by Correa et al. (2010) indicate that genera in Lymnaeidae do not reflect phylogenetic relationships, to the notable exception of Radix (including Radix natalensis).

The type species of Lymnaea is Lymnaea stagnalis Linnaeus, 1758; the type species of Stagnicola Jeffreys, 1830 is Stagnicola palustris (= Lymnaea palustris); and the type species of Omphiscola Rafinesque, 1819 is Omphiscola glabra. However, it is clear that these three species belong to the same clade (C2) and that Lymnaea is not a monophyletic group. Correa et al. (2010) proposed that species of clade C2 should all be called Lymnaea, according to the principle of priority of the International Code of Zoological Nomenclature (ICZN). By extension, Stagnicola should not be used to name species in clade C1a since the type species belongs to clade C2. Meier-Brook & Bargues (2002) suggested including Stagnicola emarginata, Stagnicola elodes, Stagnicola catascopium and Lymnaea occulta within a new genus Catascopia, while Stagnicla caperata would belong to the genus Hinkleyia Baker, 1928. The phylogeny by Correa et al. (2010) does not conflict with this nomenclature, although it would seem preferable to identify all species of clade C1a with the same name to reflect the close evolutionary relationships among these species. Hinkleyia would be the preferable name according to the ICZN. On the other hand, at least four genera names have been used for species of clade C1b: Lymnaea Lamarck, 1799; Galba Schrank, 1803; Fossaria Westerlund, 1885; and Bakerilymnaea. In the light of the present results, it would be preferable to unify nomenclature. According to the ICZN, Lymnaea should be the unified name, but given that the type species belongs to clade C2, Galba could be a more appropriate name. Finally, as said above, Austropeplea Cotton, 1942 is not a monophyletic group, and employing the genus Kutikina Ponder & Waterhouse, 1997 (one species: Kutikina hispida) seems unjustified on the basis of the current phylogeny. This would also be consistent with results of Puslednik et al. (2009). It would be preferable to use Bullastra Pfeiffer, 1839 for all species of clade C3a to fit the ICZN.

Genera
Genera in the family Lymnaeidae include:

subfamily Lymnaeinae
 Acella Haldeman, 1841
 Aenigmomphiscola Kruglov & Starobogatov, 1981
 Bulimnea Haldeman, 1841
 Corvusiana Servain, 1881 - probably a subgenus of Stagnicola
 subgenus Corvusiana sensu stricto
 subgenus Kuesterilymnaea Vinarski, 2003
 Erinna H. Adams & A. Adams, 1858
 Galba Schrank, 1803 - synonym: Fossaria Westerlund, 1885
 subgenus Galba sensu stricto
 subgenus Bakerilymnaea Weyrauch, 1964
 subgenus Sibirigalba Kruglov et Starobogatov, 1985
 Hinkleyia F. C. Baker, 1928
 Ladislavella B. Dybowski, 1913 - synonym: Catascopia Meier-Brook & Bargues, 2002
 subgenus Lymnaea sensu stricto
 subgenus Kazakhlymnaea Kruglov & Starobogatov, 1984
 Lymnaea Lamarck, 1799 - type genus of the family Lymnaeidae
 Omphiscola Rafinesque, 1819
 Pseudoisidora Thiele, 1931
 subgenus Pseudoisidora sensu stricto
 subgenus Pseudobulinus Kruglov & Starobogatov, 1993
 Pseudosuccinea F. C. Baker, 1908
 Sphaerogalba Kruglov & Starobogatov, 1985 - possibly a synonym of Bakerilymnaea
 Stagnicola Leach in Jeffreys, 1830
 Walhiana Servain, 1881 - probably a subgenus of Stagnicola
 Walterigalba Kruglov & Starobogatov, 1985 - probably a subgenus of Hinkleyia
Genera brought into synonymy
 Catascopia Meier-Brook & Bargues, 2002: synonym of Ladislavella B. Dybowski, 1913
 Fossaria Westerlund, 1885: synonym of Galba Schrank, 1803
 Limnaea: synonym of Lymnaea Lamarck, 1799
 Limneus Sandberger, 1875: synonym of Lymnaea Lamarck, 1799
 Limneus auct.: synonym of Lymnaea Lamarck, 1799
 Limnophysa Fitzinger, 1833: synonym of Stagnicola Jeffreys, 1830
 Lymnaeus: synonym of Lymnaea Lamarck, 1799
 Nasonia F. C. Baker, 1928: synonym of Galba (Bakerilymnaea) Weyrauch, 1964 represented as Galba Schrank, 1803
 Truncatuliana Servain, 1881: synonym of Galba Schrank, 1803
 Walterlymnaea Starobogatov & Budnikova, 1976: synonym of Ladislavella B. Dybowski, 1913

subfamily Amphipepleinae Pini, 1877  (synonym: Radicinae Vinarski, 2013)
 Austropeplea B. C. Cotton, 1942 - synonym: Kutikina Ponder & Waterhouse, 1997 (there was one species Kutikina hispida).
 Bullastra Bergh, 1901
 Lantzia Jousseaume, 1872
 Limnobulla Kruglov & Starobogatov, 1985
 Myxas G. B. Sowerby, 1822
 Orientogalba Kruglov & Starobogatov, 1985
 Pacifimyxas Kruglov & Starobogatov, 1985
 Pectinidens Pilsbry, 1911
 Radix Montfort, 1810 - type genus of the subfamily Radicinae
 subgenus Radix sensu stricto
 subgenus Peregriana Servain, 1881
 Cerasina Kobelt, 1880 - taxon inquirendum: maybe it is a synonym of Radix
Genera brought into synonymy
 Amphipeplea Nilsson, 1822: synonym of Myxas G. B. Sowerby I, 1822
 Auriculariana Servain, 1881: synonym of Radix Montfort, 1810
 Cyclolimnaea Dall, 1905: synonym of Myxas G. B. Sowerby I, 1822
 Gulnaria Turton, 1831: synonym of Radix Montfort, 1810
 Kutikina Ponder & Waterhouse, 1997: synonym of Austropeplea Cotton, 1942
 Neritostoma H. Adams & A. Adams, 1855: synonym of Radix Montfort, 1810

subfamily Lancinae

 Idaholanx Clark, Campbell & Lydeard, 2017 - with the only species Idaholanx fresti Clark, Campbell & Lydeard, 2017
 Lanx Clessin, 1880 - type genus of the subfamily Lancinae

† subfamily Scalaxinae
 Scalaxis Pilsbry, 1909 - type genus of the subfamily Scalaxinae

† subfamily Valencieniinae
 † Provalenciennesia Gorjanović-Kramberger, 1923
 † Valenciennius Rousseau, 1842 - type genus of the subfamily Valencieniinae
Genera brought into synonymy
 † Provalenciennius Gorjanović-Kramberger, 1923: synonym of † Provalenciennesia Gorjanović-Kramberger, 1923
 † Valenciennesia Fischer, 1859: synonym of † Valenciennius Rousseau, 1842

subfamily ?
 Adelinella Wenz, 1922
 † Boskovicia Brusina, 1894
 † Clivunella Katzer, 1918
 † Corymbina Bulowski, 1892
 Fisherola Hannibal, 1912
 Glacilimnea Iredale, 1943
  † Hiscerus Gorjanović-Kramberger, 1923
 Peplimnea Iredale, 1943
 Simlimnea Iredale, 1943
 † Undulotheca Gorjanović-Kramberger, 1923
 † Velutinopsis Sandberger, 1875
  † Zagrabica Brusina, 1884

Distribution 
Lymnaeidae snails occur worldwide, however, most species occur in the Palearctic and Nearctic regions. An unidentified fragmentary lymnaeid from deposits of the Meyer Desert Formation (reported in 2003) was the first freshwater snail recorded from Antarctica.

Description 
This family exhibits a great diversity in shell morphology but extremely homogeneous anatomical traits. Diversity of shell morphology is linked to substantial eco-phenotypic plasticity. Hubendick (1951) illustrated this point by compiling up to 1143 species names, a large number of which he synonymized. In contrast, the anatomy of their reproductive tracts (including prostate, penis and preputium) is extremely homogeneous. Immunological, cytogenetical, enzyme electrophoresis studies, and DNA-based approaches have demonstrated extensive homoplasy in anatomical characters.

Ecology 
Lymnaeidae are of major medical and veterinary importance since they act as vectors of parasites (helminths, mainly trematodes, e.g., Fasciola liver flukes) that severely affect human populations and livestock, and cause important economic losses. Lymnaeids serve as intermediate hosts of at least 71 trematode species distributed among 13 families, including some species of Schistosomatidae and Echinostomatidae, with implications for human health, and Paramphistomum daubneyi, which is of veterinary interest. The most emblematic case of parasite transmitted by lymnaeids is Fasciola hepatica (Digenea: Fasciolidae), the agent of fascioliasis. Mollusks, generally lymnaeids, are required as intermediate hosts to complete the life cycle of Fasciola hepatica. At least 20 species of Lymnaeidae have been described as potential vectors of fascioliasis.

References
This article incorporates CC-BY-2.0 text from the reference

Further reading 
 Baker F. C. (1911). "The Lymnaeidae of North and Middle America". Special publication of the Chicago Academy of Sciences, 3: XVI+539 pp.
 Kruglov N. D. & Starobogatov Y. I. (1993). "Annotated and illustrated catalogue of species of the family Lymnaeidae (Gastropoda, Pulmonata, Lymnaeiformes) of Palaearctic and adjacent river drainage areas. Part 1." Ruthenica 1: 65–92.
 Vinarski, V.M. (2013). One, two, or several? How many lymnaeid genera are there?. Ruthenica. 23(1): 41-58

External links 
 

 
Taxa named by Constantine Samuel Rafinesque